Affiliyated is a remix EP of Gayngs' 2010 debut studio album, Relayted, by Doomtree. It premiered on Stereogum on March 4, 2011. The EP was produced by Cecil Otter, Paper Tiger, P.O.S, and Lazerbeak, among others. The producers were handed 10 random stems from Relayted to build a new song out of them. The EP's release show was held at First Avenue on March 6, 2011.

Track listing

Personnel
Credits adapted from liner notes.

 Gayngs – music
 Cecil Otter – remix (1, 7)
 Sims – guest appearance (1)
 MK Larada – remix (2)
 Paper Tiger – remix (3)
 Plain Ole Bill – remix (4), turntables
 Mike Mictlan – guest appearance (4)
 The Chocolate Ox – guest appearance (4)
 P.O.S – remix (5)
 Lazerbeak – remix (6)
 The Cook Brothers – keyboards

References

External links
 
 Affiliyated at Bandcamp

2011 EPs
2011 remix albums
Remix EPs
Gayngs albums
Doomtree Records albums